Sunset is the time when the Sun disappears below the horizon in the west.

Sunset, Sunsets, The Sunset or Sun Set may also refer to:

Arts, entertainment, and media

Films
Sunset (1988 film), a 1988 western directed by Blake Edwards
Sunset (1990 film), a 1990 Russian film about fictional gangster Benya Krik based in Isaac Babel's stories
Sunset (2018 film), a 2018 Hungarian film directed by László Nemes

Literature
Sunset (novel), a 2006 Warriors: The New Prophecy novel by Erin Hunter
Sunset (play), a 1927 play novel by Isaac Babel
"Sunsets" (poem), ("Soleils couchants"), a set of six poems, or a six-part poem, by Victor Hugo

Music

Groups and labels
Shakin' Stevens and the Sunsets, a Welsh rock band
Sunset Records, an American record label

Albums
Sun Set, a box set by Klaatu, 2005
Sunset (Michel Teló album), 2013
Sunset (Superbus album), 2013
Sunset (EP), by Pete Yorn, 2000
Sunset, half of the Coldplay album Everyday Life, 2019
Sunsets (DVD), by Powderfinger, 2004
Sunsets, by Chris Watson, 1994

Songs
"Sunset" (bugle call), a military bugle call in the UK and British Commonwealth
"Sunset (Bird of Prey)", by Fatboy Slim, 2000
"Sunset", by Air Supply from Air Supply
"Sunset", by Boyd Rice (NON) from Easy Listening for Iron Youth
"Sunset", by Caroline Polachek from Desire, I Want to Turn Into You
"Sunset", by Demi Lovato from Dancing with the Devil... the Art of Starting Over
"Sunset", by Farruko
"Sunset", by J. Cole from Revenge of the Dreamers III
"Sunset", by Jackie Lomax from Is This What You Want?
"Sunset", by Kate Bush from Aerial
"Sunset", by Kim Dong-han from D-Day
"Sunset", by Marques Houston from Mr. Houston
"Sunset", by Mike Oldfield from Light + Shade
"Sunset", by Roxy Music from Stranded
"Sunset", by Stevie Wonder from Tribute to Uncle Ray
"Sunsets" (song), a 2004 song by Powderfinger

Television
"Sunset" (Breaking Bad), a season three episode of Breaking Bad
"Sunset" (True Blood), an episode of the HBO TV series True Blood
Sunset Productions, an American television syndication company

Other uses in arts, entertainment, and media
Sunset (Eugène Delacroix), a mid 19th century drawing by Eugene Delacroix
Sunset (magazine), an American lifestyle magazine
Sunset (video game), a 2015 art game by Belgium developer Tale of Tales
Sunset Shimmer, a character in the My Little Pony: Equestria Girls franchise

Fruits
Sunset (apple), an apple cultivar
Sunset (mango), a mango cultivar

Places

Australia
Sunset, Queensland, a suburb of Mount Isa
Sunset, Victoria

Canada
Sunset, Vancouver, a neighbourhood

United Kingdom
Sunset, Herefordshire

United States
Sunset, Arizona
Sunset, Washington County, Arkansas
Sunset, Arkansas
Sunset, California
Sunset, Florida
Sunset, Louisiana
Sunset, Missouri
Sunset, Maine

Sunset, South Carolina
Sunset, Montague County, Texas
Sunset, Starr County, Texas
Sunset, Utah
Sunset, Texas (disambiguation)
Sunset, West Virginia
Sunset, Wisconsin
Bankhead House (Jasper, Alabama), also known as Sunset
Sunset 4A Region, Nevada
Sunset Crater, Arizona, U.S.
Sunset District, San Francisco, California, U.S.
Sunset Drive, the major roadway through downtown South Miami, Florida, U.S.

Transportation
 Sunset (RIRTR station), a former Rochester Industrial and Rapid Transit Railway station located in Brighton, New York, U.S.
 17th Street/Santa Monica College station, in Los Angeles; formerly named "Sunset"

Other uses
 Sunset (color), a pale tint of orange
 Sunset (computing), the planned discontinuation of a server, service, software feature, etc.
 Sunset provision, a clause in a statute that terminates the law after a certain date unless further legislative action is taken

See also
Sunset Bay (disambiguation)
Sunset Beach (disambiguation)
Sunset Boulevard (disambiguation)
Sunset Grill (disambiguation)
Sunset High School (disambiguation)
Sunset Park (disambiguation)
Sunset station (disambiguation)